DC State Fair is an organization in Washington, D.C., that is culturally analogous to state fairs elsewhere in the United States.  It is an organization dedicated to showcasing D.C. residents' talents in baking, cooking, brewing, crafting, gardening and sewing.

Past Fairs 
 2010: Inaugural fair was held on August 28, 2010 at a neighborhood festival, Columbia Heights Day, and had 11 competitions. 
 2011: Rescheduled for October 1, 2011 due to Hurricane Irene and held at the Crafty Bastards art festival as a cornerstone vendor in the first-ever Crafty Farm area.
 2012: The third Fair featured 20 contests and was held on September 22, 2012 at community festival Barracks Row Fall Festival.
 2013: Held September 28, 2013 at the Barracks Row Fall Festival.
 2014: Held September 20, 2014 at Old City Farm & Guild.
 2015: Held September 12, 2015 at Old City Farm & Guild and featured a "best bud" marijuana contest.
 2016: Held August 28, 2016 at NoMa Junction at Storey Park.
 2017: Held September 24, 2017 at Waterfront Station in Southwest DC.
 2018: Held September 23, 2018 at Waterfront Station in Southwest DC.
 2019: Held September 8, 2019 at the Gateway DC park on the St. Elizabeths Hospital campus in Southeast DC.
 2020: Will be held on 13 September 2020 via online as live events were cancelled caused by the COVID-19 pandemic.

References

External links 

Festivals in Washington, D.C.
State fairs
Urban agriculture
Festivals established in 2010